Edward Bootle-Wilbraham may refer to:

Edward Bootle-Wilbraham, 1st Baron Skelmersdale (1771–1853)
Edward Bootle-Wilbraham, 1st Earl of Lathom (1837–1898)
Edward George Bootle-Wilbraham, 2nd Earl of Lathom (1864–1910)